Rugby in the Netherlands may refer to:

Rugby league in the Netherlands
Rugby union in the Netherlands